State Route 192 (SR 192) is a  route that serves as a bypass route around western Enterprise.

Route description
The western terminus of SR 192 is located at its intersection with SR 167 south of Enterprise. From this point, the route travels in a northwesterly, and then northerly direction as it circles around the western side of the city.  As the route approaches its terminus at US 84, it has completed a half-circle around Enterprise, and westbound SR 192 is actually traveling in an eastward direction.

Major intersections

References

External links

192
Transportation in Coffee County, Alabama
Enterprise, Alabama